Ursinus may refer to:
 Ursinus College, a liberal arts college in Collegeville, Pennsylvania.
 The first bishop of the diocese of Bourges, Saint Ursinus
 Ursinus the Abbot, author of the Life of Leodegar († after 690)
 Johannes Heinrich Ursinus (1608–1667), Lutheran theologian from Regensburg
 An alias of the Antipope Ursicinus († after 384)
 Zacharias Ursinus, a German theologian († 1583)
 Oskar Ursinus, the German aviation pioneer († 1952)

Latin-language surnames